Renegade Five is a Swedish rock band from Karlstad, Sweden. It consists of Anders Fernette (vocals), Håkan Fredriksson (keyboard), Per Lidén (guitar), Jimmy Lundin (bass) and Marcus Nowak (drums). The band formed in 2005 and is currently signed to Bonnier Amigo.

Their first single, "Shadows", was released in early 2008, followed by their debut album, Undergrounded Universe, a year later.

The band was nominated for a Grammis in 2010.

On 5 May 2011, Renegade Five published a new single: "Alive". In April 2012 they released their newest album, NXT GEN.

Discography

Albums
 Undergrounded Universe (February, 2009)

 Life Is Already Fading (September 21, 2011)

 Nxt Gen (April, 2012)

Singles
 "Shadows" (September, 2007)
 "Love Will Remain" (January, 2008)
 "Running In Your Veins" (March, 2008)
 "Darkest Age" (September, 2008)
 "Save My Soul" (January, 2009)
 "Alive" (April 29, 2011)
 "Life is Already Fading" (September 21, 2011)
 "This Pain Will Do Me Good" (February, 2012)
 "Surrender" (March, 2012)
 "Erase Me" (January, 2013)
 "Bring Me Back to Life" (September, 2015)
 "Sorry" (May, 2018)

References

External links
 Official website

Bonnier Amigo Music Group artists
Swedish rock music groups